Gomulin  is a village in the administrative district of Gmina Wola Krzysztoporska, within Piotrków County, Łódź Voivodeship, in central Poland.

The village has an approximate population of 960.

References

Gomulin